This article lists the largest companies in Ireland in terms of their revenue, net profit and total assets, according to the American business magazines Fortune and Forbes. A large part of companies on both lists are registered in Ireland for tax purposes.

2022 Fortune list 
This list displays all 3 Irish companies in the Fortune Global 500, which ranks the world's largest companies by annual revenue. The figures below are given in millions of US dollars and are for the fiscal year 2021. Also listed are the headquarters location, net profit, number of employees worldwide and industry sector of each company.

2022 Forbes list 

This list is based on the Forbes Global 2000, which ranks the world's 2,000 largest publicly traded companies. The Forbes list takes into account a multitude of factors, including the revenue, net profit, total assets and market value of each company; each factor is given a weighted rank in terms of importance when considering the overall ranking. The table below also lists the headquarters location and industry sector of each company. The figures are in billions of US dollars and are for the year 2021.

See also 

 List of companies of Ireland
 List of largest companies by revenue

References 

Ireland
companies